Living Off Xperience is the fourth studio album by American hip hop group The Lox. It was released on August 28, 2020 through D-Block and Roc Nation. The album features guest appearances from Benny the Butcher, Clay Dub, DMX, Dyce Payne, Jeremih, Oswin Benjamin, T-Pain and Westside Gunn.

Track listing

Charts

References

2020 albums
The Lox albums
D-Block Records albums
Roc Nation albums
Albums produced by AraabMuzik
Albums produced by Large Professor
Albums produced by Nottz
Albums produced by Scott Storch
Albums produced by Statik Selektah
Albums produced by Swizz Beatz